The Arsonist is a 1995 Malaysian drama film directed by U-Wei Haji Saari based on the 1939 short story "Barn Burning" by William Faulkner. It was first screened in the Un Certain Regard section at the 1995 Cannes Film Festival, then later into Malaysian cinemas in 2001.

Cast
 Khalid Salleh as Kakang
 Ngasrizal Ngasri as Raden Mas Kesuma, Kakang's youngest son
 Azizah Mahzan as Kakang's wife
 Anwar Idris as Mustapha
 Jamaluddin Kadir as Tuan Kassim
 Kuswadinata as Tok Empat

References

External links
 

1995 films
1995 drama films
Films based on works by William Faulkner
Malay-language films
Malaysian drama films
Films directed by U-Wei Saari
Films with screenplays by U-Wei Saari
Films based on American short stories